Pratylenchus dulscus is a plant pathogenic nematode infecting almond trees.

References 

dulscus
Plant pathogenic nematodes
Fruit tree diseases